Manganin is a trademarked name for an alloy of typically 84.2% copper, 12.1% manganese, and 3.7% nickel. It was first developed by Edward Weston in 1892, improving upon his Constantan (1887).

Manganin foil and wire is used in the manufacture of resistors, particularly ammeter shunts, because of its virtually zero temperature coefficient of resistance value and long term stability. Several Manganin resistors served as the legal standard for the ohm in the United States from 1901 to 1990.  Manganin wire is also used as an electrical conductor in cryogenic systems, minimizing heat transfer between points which need electrical connections.

Manganin is also used in gauges for studies of high-pressure shock waves (such as those generated from the detonation of explosives) because it has low strain sensitivity but high hydrostatic pressure sensitivity.

History 

In 1887 Edward Weston discovered that metals can have a negative temperature coefficient of resistance, inventing what he called his "Alloy No. 2." 
It was produced in Germany where it was renamed "Constantan". Five years later, after experimenting with alloys of copper, nickel, and manganese, he developed Manganin. In May 1893, Weston received a patent for the material and its use for resistors. While Manganin represented a significant advance in technology -- the material was a conductive metal with constant resistance over a wide range of working temperatures, Weston did not receive wide recognition at the time.

Properties

Cu86/Mn12/Ni2 

Electrical Properties
 Temperature coefficient: 
Mechanical Properties
 Modulus of elasticity: 124–159 GPa
 Maximum use temperature in air: 300 °C

See also 
List of named alloys

References

External links 
 Isabellenhütte - 1889 Manganin

Copper alloys
Nickel alloys